Paul Miller may refer to:

Art 
Paul Miller (actor) (born 1960), Canadian actor
Paul Miller (TV director), television director
Paul Miller (theatre director), artistic director of the Orange Tree Theatre
Paul D. Miller, better known as DJ Spooky (born 1970), American hip-hop musician

Politics and government 
Paul Miller (North Carolina politician), former Democratic member of the North Carolina General Assembly
Paul Miller (Canadian politician) (born 1951), politician in Hamilton, Ontario
Paul David Miller (born 1941), retired Admiral in the United States Navy
Paul D. Miller (academic), American academic, blogger, and U.S. government official.
Paul W. Miller (1899–1976), Pennsylvania politician

Sports 
Paul Miller (cyclist) (born 1963), Australian professional road cyclist
Paul Miller (defensive end) (1930–2007), NFL player
Paul Miller (halfback) (1913–1992), NFL player
Paul Miller (American football coach)
Paul Miller (baseball) (born 1965), 1990s major league baseball pitcher
Paul Miller (basketball) (born 1982), American basketball player
Paul Miller (boxer) (born 1978), Australian boxer
Paul Miller (footballer, born 1959), English footballer, played for Tottenham
Paul Miller (footballer, born 1968), English footballer, played for Wimbledon and Bristol Rovers
Paul Miller (ice hockey) (born 1959), retired American professional ice hockey forward
Paul Miller (rugby union) (born 1977), former New Zealand rugby union player
Paul Miller (racing driver), American former racing driver, in 1982 24 Hours of Le Mans

Other 
Paul Miller (journalist) (1906–1991), head of Gannett Company and the Associated Press
Paul Miller (radio presenter) (born 1966), presenter on BBC local radio
Paul A. Miller (1917–2015), president of the Rochester Institute of Technology, 1969–1979
Paul Steven Miller (1961–2010), lawyer, disability rights advocate and professor
Paul F. Miller (1932–2012), American sculptor and art educator
Paul Miller (author), British digital consultant, author and social entrepreneur
Paul Nicholas Miller, better known as GypsyCrusader (born 1988), American white supremacist, convicted felon and former Muay Thai fighter

See also 
Paul Millar (disambiguation)